Sailing competitions at the 2020 Summer Olympics in Tokyo took place from 25 July to 4 August 2021 at the Enoshima Yacht Harbor in Enoshima. The venue was also used for the 1964 Olympic Games although significantly regenerated, the IOC now encouraging regeneration, cost reductions and sustainability. The RS:X, Laser, Laser Radial, Finn, 470, 49er, 49erFX, and Nacra17 are all returning for 2020; there are no significant changes to the Olympic programme from 2016.

Competition format

Qualification 

The number of sailors competing has been reduced from 380 to 350, with an equal numbers of male and female athletes for the first time ever. 

The qualification period commenced at the 2018 Sailing World Championships in Aarhus, Denmark. There, 101 places, about forty percent of the total quota, will be awarded to the highest finishing nations. Six places will be available in the men's Laser and women's Laser Radial classes at the 2018 Asian Games and 2019 Pan American Games, whereas sixty-one more will be distributed to the sailors at the World Championships for all boats in 2019. Continental qualification regattas were held to decide the remainder of the total quota, while two spots each in the one-person dinghy classes were granted to eligible NOCs through the Tripartite Commission Invitation.

As hosts, Japan has been guaranteed one quota place in each of the ten classes.

Classes (equipment)

Scoring 

The format for the 2020 Olympics is fleet racing, where all competitors start and sail the course together. They are scored according to the low-point system, where first place is scored 1, second place is scored 2, etc. There is a series of preliminary races followed by the final Medal Race. The RS:X, 49er, 49erFX, and Nacra 17 classes have 12 preliminary races, other classes have 10.

At the end of the preliminary races, the top ten boats in each class (i.e. those with the lowest total scores) advance to the Medal Race. Each boat might exclude one race from their total. The Medal Race cannot be excluded from the series score and counts double. The boat with the lowest overall total after all races is the winner. Any ties in the final rankings are broken in favour of the competitor/crew finishing higher in the Medal Race.

Competition schedule

Actual Schedule

Original Schedule

Participating nations

Medal summary

Medal table

Men's events

Women's events

Mixed events

See also
Sailing at the 2018 Asian Games
Sailing at the 2019 Pan American Games

References

External links
 Results book 

 
Sailing competitions in Japan
2020
2020 Summer Olympics events
2021 in sailing